Bert Cooper was a boxer.

Bert or Bertie Cooper may also refer to:
Bert Cooper (American football), American football player
Bert Cooper (Mad Men)
Bertie Cooper, Australian rules footballer

See also
Albert Cooper (disambiguation)
Robert Cooper (disambiguation)
Herbert Cooper, cricketer